Burnfoot may refer to:
Burnfoot, County Londonderry, Northern Ireland
Burnfoot, County Donegal, Republic of Ireland
Burnfoot, Dumfries and Galloway, Scotland
Burnfoot, East Ayrshire,  Scotland
Burnfoot, North Lanarkshire (neighbourhood of Airdrie), Scotland
Burnfoot, Roberton, Scottish Borders, Scotland
Burnfoot, Scottish Borders, Scotland